is a district located in Tokachi Subprefecture, Hokkaido, Japan.

As of 2004, the district has an estimated population of 16,735 and a density of 10.80 persons per km2. The total area is 1,550.06 km2.

Towns and villages
Hiroo
Taiki

History
April 1, 1906 Taiki Village, Rekifune Village, and part of Tōbui Village from the former Tōbui District merge with Moyori Village (now Hiroo Town)
April 1, 1955 Part of Ōtsu Village, Tokachi District incorporated into Taiki Town.
On February 6, 2006 the village of Chūrui merged into the town of Makubetsu, in Nakagawa (Tokachi) District.

Districts in Hokkaido